CDMS may refer to:
 Charge detection mass spectrometry
 Clinical Data Management System
 Clinically Definite Multiple Sclerosis  
 Cryogenic Dark Matter Search